Fern is a British talk show hosted by Fern Britton which aired on Channel 4 on weekdays at 5:00pm in March and April 2011. The format is a teatime chat show featuring real-life stories, a mix of gossip and entertainment.  The studio had a sofa area for interviewing celebrity guests, a kitchen area, two smaller areas for interviewing other guests and an audience.  Britton interviewed a range of guests on the show including actors Alan Cumming, Richard Wilson and Richard E. Grant, singer Coleen Nolan, disc-jockeys Chris Evans and Chris Moyles, musician Brian May, comedians Alan Carr and Miranda Hart and charity fundraiser Jack Henderson.

Fern received lower ratings than expected, and was axed after its four-week trial run.  Britton is said to be discussing alternative formats with Channel 4 and her chat show may be revived at a later date in a different format.

References

External links
 

2010s British television talk shows
2011 British television series debuts
2011 British television series endings
British television talk shows
Channel 4 talk shows
English-language television shows
Television series by All3Media